Georgi Belousov (born December 26, 1990) is a Russian professional ice hockey player currently with Avtomobilist Yekaterinburg in the Kontinental Hockey League (KHL).

Belousov previously played with HC Vityaz Podolsk of the KHL during the 2012–13 season. On June 16, 2014, Belousov signed an initial try-out contract with Lada Togliatti, before he was given a two-year contract on August 21, 2014.

References

External links

1990 births
Living people
Avtomobilist Yekaterinburg players
HC Lada Togliatti players
HC Neftekhimik Nizhnekamsk players
People from Korkino
Russian ice hockey forwards
HC Vityaz players
Sportspeople from Chelyabinsk Oblast